Caleb Daniel Clarke (born 29 March 1999) is a New Zealand rugby union player who plays for the  in the Super Rugby competition.  His position of choice is wing. Clarke made his international debut for New Zealand in 2020 and has since played five tests.

Early life

Clarke attended Mount Albert Grammar School and was first selected for the school's First XV aged 14, where he played until 2016.

Playing career

Early career 
Clarke was selected for the All Blacks Sevens in 2018, following his first season for Auckland in the Mitre 10 Cup.

Good performances for Auckland also led to Clarke's selection for the New Zealand U20's, for 2017 and 2018.

In 2019, his second season of Super Rugby, Clarke also became a regular starter for the Blues, under new Head Coach, Leon MacDonald.

2020

Due to the COVID-19 pandemic, Clarke, as well as his teammates from the New Zealand Rugby Sevens team, were released to play for their provinces and Super Rugby clubs. Clarke was in career-best form following New Zealand's national lockdown, leading to his selection for the All Blacks squad for the 2020 Bledisloe Cup and Tri Nations Series.

He made his debut for New Zealand in their 16–16 draw with the Wallabies at Wellington's Sky Stadium. After a season-ending injury to George Bridge, Clarke started in four tests that year, on the left wing. Clarke scored his first try for the All Blacks on 14 November, in a historic first-ever loss to Argentina.

Personal life 
Clarke is a first-generation New Zealander and has Samoan ancestry through his father. His father, Eroni Clarke, who is also a former All Black, played international rugby as a centre, from 1992 to 1998.

References

External links
 

1999 births
New Zealand rugby union players
New Zealand sportspeople of Samoan descent
Blues (Super Rugby) players
Auckland rugby union players
Rugby union players from Auckland
New Zealand international rugby sevens players
Rugby union wings
Living people
New Zealand international rugby union players